The Girl-Shy Cowboy is a 1928 American silent Western film starring Rex Bell and directed by R.L. Hough. It was based on a story by Seton I. Miller.

Cast 
 Rex Bell as Joe Benson
 George Meeker as Harry Lasser
 Patsy O'Leary as Alice Weldon
 Donald Stuart as Red Harden

External links

References 

1928 films
1928 Western (genre) films
American black-and-white films
Silent American Western (genre) films
1920s English-language films
1920s American films